The 1964 New Mexico State Aggies football team represented New Mexico State University as an independent school during the 1964 NCAA University Division football season. In its seventh year under head coach Warren B. Woodson, the team compiled a 6–4 record and was outscored by a total of 171 to 131.

Woodson was later inducted into the College Football Hall of Fame.

Schedule

References

New Mexico State
New Mexico State Aggies football seasons
New Mexico State Aggies football